Fides et Historia is a semi-annual peer-reviewed academic journal concerning the "intersection of Christian faith and historical inquiry". It is published by The Conference on Faith and History. It is edited by Elesha Coffman.

External links
Journal homepage

Christianity studies journals
Publications established in 1968
Biannual journals
Religion history journals
Academic journals published by learned and professional societies
Historiography of Christianity